Cryptophis boschmai, also known commonly as the Carpentaria snake or the Carpentaria whip snake, is a species of venomous snake in the family Elapidae. The species is native to Australia and New Guinea.

Etymology
The specific epithet boschmai honours Dutch zoologist Hilbrand Boschma.

Description
The colouration of C. boschmai is tan to dark brown on the upper body, with a pale belly.

Behaviour
C. boschmai is terrestrial and nocturnal, sheltering during the day under bark, logs, and leaf litter.

Diet
C. boschmai preys upon small lizards.

Reproduction
The species C. boschmai is viviparous, with an average litter size of eight.

Geographic range and habitat
The distribution of C. boschmai in Australia extends from the northern part of the Cape York Peninsula, covering eastern Queensland as far south as the border with New South Wales, where it inhabits dry forests, woodlands, shrubland, and grasslands. The type locality is Merauke in southern New Guinea.

References

Further reading
Brongersma LD, Knaap-van Meeuven MS (1964). "On a new species of Denisonia (Reptilia, Serpentes) from New Guinea". Zoologische Mededelingen 39: 550–554. (Denisonia boschmai, new species).
Cogger HG (2014). Reptiles and Amphibians of Australia, Seventh Edition. Clayton, Victoria, Australia: CSIRO Publishing. xxx + 1,033 pp. . (Cryptophis boschmai, p. 873).
Escoriza Boj D (2005). "Reptiles and Amphibians of Australia, Part 1: Rainforest". Reptilia (Great Britain) (40): 70–75. (Cryptophis boschmai, new combination).
Mengden GA (1983). "The taxonomy of Australian elapid snakes: a review". Records of the Australian Museum 35 (5): 195–222. (Unechis boschmai, new combination, p. 216).
Shine R (1994). "Sexual Size Dimorphism in Snakes Revisited". Copeia 1994 (2): 326–346. (Suta boschmai, new combination).
Wilson SK, Knowles DG (1988). Australia's Reptiles: A Photographic Reference to the Terrestrial Reptiles of Australia. Sydney: William Collins. 447 pp. . (Rhinoplocephalus boschmai, new combination).
Wilson S, Swan G (2013). A Complete Guide to Reptiles of Australia, Fourth Edition. Sydney: New Holland Publishers. 522 pp. .

 
boschmai
Snakes of Australia
Snakes of New Guinea
Reptiles of Queensland
Taxa named by Leo Brongersma
Reptiles described in 1964